Pittsview, at one time known as Pittsboro, is an unincorporated community in Russell County, Alabama, United States.

Geography
The community is located in rural southern Russell County. U.S. Route 431 passes just west of the community as a four-lane divided highway, leading north  to Phenix City, the Russell County seat, and south  to Eufaula.

Gallery

References

Unincorporated communities in Alabama
Unincorporated communities in Russell County, Alabama